"Heart by Heart" is a song by Demi Lovato from The Mortal Instruments: City of Bones soundtrack. The song starts off slow and stripped down with Lovato’s clear voice accompanied by a piano and slowly builds to a rock crescendo.

Critical and commercial reception
The song received mostly positive reviews from critics upon its release. Hollywood Life correspondent Tierney McAfee labelled "Heart by Heart" the best love song of the summer "by far", citing the dynamic production and Demi's emotive vocals, which McAfee described as "pack[ing] a big emotional punch". The Huffington Post called the song "hauntingly beautiful" and praised the "powerful" piano-based instrumentation. Sam Lansky of Idolator lauded Lovato's "absolutely monster vocals" on the "soaring power ballad" and felt the song was anthemic, drawing comparisons to other Warren songs.

Chart performance

References

2013 songs
Demi Lovato songs
Pop ballads
Rock ballads
Songs written by Diane Warren